Beverley Racecourse is a thoroughbred horse racing venue located in the town of Beverley in the East Riding of Yorkshire, England.

Racing in Beverley can be documented as far back as over 300 years ago, and the founding of The Jockey Club in 1752 really formalised its presence in the town. With the founding of The Jockey Club, the occasional racing at nearby Westwood Pasture was recognised, and Beverley Racecourse was founded. An annual meeting at Beverley was first established in 1767.  Before that races had only occasionally been run there.  Then, for a short period between 1798 and 1805 racing once again stopped.  Later in the 19th century a three-day meeting was taking place annually in the week after York's May meeting.  In 2012, Beverley hosted racing on 19 days.  Its most prestigious races being two Listed races - the Hilary Needler Trophy for two-year-olds in May and Beverley Bullet Sprint over 5 furlongs in August for three-year-olds and up.

The racecourse is a right-handed flat course, that is just over 1 mile 3 furlongs.  It is predominantly flat but with a stiff, uphill finish and tight turns.  Beverley has the most pronounced "draw bias" on a UK racecourse on its 5 furlong course. The sharp right hand bend and the fact that the ground runs away to the left make a low draw (i.e. on the inside rail) much more advantageous than a high draw (i.e. on the wide outside and on ground sloping right to left).

The first grandstand was commissioned for the racecourse on 22 May 1767 at a cost of £1,000.  A £90,000 stand was opened in Tattersalls enclosure in 1968.

In August 2018, it was announced that planning permission was being sought for a £4.8 million grandstand to replace the existing 1960s structure, with an expected completion of April 2021.

It has been described as an "unpretentious but agreeable" racecourse.

As of July 2019, 10 horses have died at the racecourse since 2007.

Notable races

Other race
 Brian Yeardley Trophy

See also
List of British racecourses

References

Bibliography

External links

Beverley Racecourse (Official website)
Course guide on GG.COM

 
Horse racing venues in England
Horse racing venues in Yorkshire
Sports venues in the East Riding of Yorkshire
Beverley